Poshtkuh Rural District is in Falard District of Lordegan County, Chaharmahal and Bakhtiari province, Iran. At the census of 2006, its population was 8,569 in 1,783 households; there were 9,575 inhabitants in 2,262 households at the following census of 2011; and in the most recent census of 2016, the population of the rural district was 9,081 in 2,468 households. The largest of its 34 villages was Shah Najaf, with 1,131 people.

References 

Lordegan County

Rural Districts of Chaharmahal and Bakhtiari Province

Populated places in Chaharmahal and Bakhtiari Province

Populated places in Lordegan County